The Rosh Pinah Wind Power Station, is a planned 40 MW wind-power plant in Namibia. The wind farm is under development by Namibia Power Corporation Limited (NamPower), the Namibian electricity parastatal company. This wind farm is intended to increase Namibia's energy generation mix. An environmental impact assessment study by the consulting firm Enviro Dynamics, has been ongoing since 2020 and will inform the management of this renewable energy project.

Location
The power station would be located in Sperrgebiet National Park, in the ǁKaras Region, near the Atlantic Ocean coast of Namibia.

Overview
The design calls for the installation of 16 wind turbines, each rated at 2.5 MW, for a total generating capacity of 40 MW. NamPower, the owner and developer of the wind farm will inject the energy from this power station, into the Namibian electricity grid.

Ownership
The power station is owned 100 percent by NamPower, the national electricity utility parastatal company that is also developing the wind farm.

Construction
In 2021, NamPower advertised for qualified engineering, procurement and construction (EPC) contractors to submit bids to construct this power station.

Other considerations
According to Power Africa, as of December 2021,Namibia had installed capacity of 680 MW. Of that, 517 MW were generated from renewable sources. However, an estimated 60 percent of the country's electricity consumption, was imported from "South Africa's Eskom and Zimbabwe's ZESA. This station is an attempt to close that energy deficit. Namibian authorities have ambition to source at least 70 percent of the national electricity consumption from renewable sources, by 2030.

See also
 List of power stations in Namibia

References

External links
 NamPower Official Website

Wind farms in Namibia
Energy infrastructure in Africa
Buildings and structures in ǁKaras Region